"Under the Sun" is a song released by record label Dreamville Records, performed by American rappers J. Cole and Lute featuring fellow American rapper DaBaby. It also has extra vocals from fellow American rapper Kendrick Lamar, who performs the short two-lined chorus of the song. The song was released as the first track on the label's album, Revenge of the Dreamers III. DaBaby received praise for his guest verse, with Billboard, Complex, and HotNewHipHop all ranking it as his best feature of 2019.

Background
In February, Dreamville gave a live preview of the song after the All Star game – which J. Cole was the halftime show performer, during the free concert in Charlotte. On Twitter, Hamad explained that Kendrick Lamar originally did not intend to appear on the track, and was at first just supposed to come and listen.

Recording and production
The song was produced by Christo, Pluss and Nice Rec, and contains an uncredited sample from "I'll Be Waiting For You" by Argo Singers. Christo spoke about the composition of the song with Billboard, saying:

Chart performance
The song debuted at number 44 on the Billboard Hot 100 and number 10 on the Rolling Stone Top 100, becoming the label's highest charting song on both charts. On May 14, 2020, the song was certified platinum by the Recording Industry Association of America (RIAA) for sales of over a million digital units in the United States.

Music video 
The music video for the song was released on September 16, 2019, on the official Dreamville YouTube channel and has over 50 million views as of May 2022. It was directed by Scott Lazer, Aisultan Seitov, David Peters, and Chad Tennies, and produced by Tripp Kramer.

Charts

Certifications

References

2019 songs
DaBaby songs
Dreamville Records singles
Interscope Records singles
J. Cole songs
Songs written by Asheton Hogan
Songs written by DaBaby
Songs written by J. Cole
Lute songs